Stella was a Swedish science fiction magazine. 

The magazine was published from April 1886 to August 1888 as a supplement to the Swedish weekly Svenska Familj-Journalen Svea and published translations of short stories by the leading science fiction writers of its time.

Though many works about science fiction refer to Stella, finding traces or copies of the magazine has proved difficult and some have concluded that Stella was a practical joke on the part of Swedish critic Sam J. Lundwall.

Notes

1886 establishments in Sweden
1888 disestablishments in Sweden
Defunct magazines published in Sweden
Magazines established in 1886
Magazines disestablished in 1888
Newspaper supplements
Science fiction magazines
Swedish-language magazines
Weekly magazines published in Sweden